Claudia Cummins (born ) is a South African female artistic gymnast, representing her nation at international competitions.

She competed at world championships, including the 2013 World Artistic Gymnastics Championships in Antwerp, Belgium.

References

External links
 https://database.fig-gymnastics.com/public/gymnasts/biography/10908/true?backUrl=%2Fpublic%2Fresults%2Fdisplay%2F5351%3FidAgeCategory%3D4%26idCategory%3D66%23anchor_28408
 http://www.intlgymnast.com/index.php?option=com_content&view=article&id=4535:list-of-2016-womens-olympic-qualifiers&catid=2:news&Itemid=53
 http://www.zimbio.com/pictures/RVP63hY4BF7/20th+Commonwealth+Games+Artistic+Gymnastics/uEAdxBqWsRI/Claudia+Cummins
http://uagym.org/DNNArticleView/tabid/97/ArticleId/21/LES-SELECTIONNES-OLYMPIQUES-SUD-AFRICAINS.aspx
 http://allafrica.com/stories/201510262022.html

1995 births
Living people
South African female artistic gymnasts
Place of birth missing (living people)
Gymnasts at the 2010 Summer Youth Olympics
Commonwealth Games competitors for South Africa
Gymnasts at the 2014 Commonwealth Games
African Games silver medalists for South Africa
African Games medalists in gymnastics
Competitors at the 2015 African Games